The Kenya Red Cross is one of the many International Red Cross and Red Crescent Movement societies around the world. The Kenya organisation was established in 1965, The Kenya Red Cross supports and runs a number of projects whilst raising awareness to the Kenyan public about the current issues or problems which may affect them. Some of the projects which are either run by or assisted by the Kenya Red Cross are Famine, blood services, first aid projects, disaster and emergency services and education services.

The patron of the Kenya Red Cross is Uhuru Kenyatta, President of Kenya. A council administers and performs a limited number of duties, and is made up of the Secretary General and twelve voting members. All other responsibilities are held by the Board which consists of 16 persons.

To supplement its humanitarian efforts, Kenya Red Cross launched a first of its kind humanitarian app, the KRCS App, which offers users real-time emergency alerts and life-saving tips, activities, easy access to Membership and Volunteerism, events and training from Kenya Red Cross, job posts plus different groups such as blood groups, youth groups and volunteer groups where members can connect and share ideas.

References

External links

 IFRC Kenya Red Cross profile
 Kenya Red Cross at Google Cultural Institute

1961 establishments in Kenya
Medical and health organisations based in Kenya
Organizations established in 1961
Red Cross and Red Crescent national societies